Mondscheinspitze is a summit of the Karwendel range in the Austrian state of Tyrol.

Though the name could be translated as Moonshine Peak, Mond originates from romance monticinu, which means small mountain meadow.

Climbing 
The Mondscheinspitze is the highest mountain in the Pre-Karwendel range. The summit can be reached from the Eng valley from the west or from the east from Pertisau. Both routes require alpine experience and are rated I or II by the alpine scale.

References 

Mountains of the Alps
Two-thousanders of Austria
Mountains of Tyrol (state)